Defending champion Alfie Hewett defeated Shingo Kunieda in the final, 6–3, 6–4 to win the men's singles wheelchair tennis title at the 2021 French Open. It was his third French Open singles title and fifth major singles title overall.

Seeds

Draw

Finals

References

 Draw

Wheelchair Men's Singles
French Open, 2021 Men's Singles